Treason is a 1933 American pre-Code Western film directed by George B. Seitz and starring Buck Jones.

Cast
 Buck Jones as Jeff Connors, posing as Chet Dawson (as Charles 'Buck' Jones)
 Shirley Grey as Joan Randall
 Robert Ellis as Colonel Jedcott
 Ivor McFadden as O'Leary (as Ivar McFadden)
 Edward LeSaint as Judge Randall (as Ed Le Saint)
 Frank Lackteen as Chet Dawson
 T.C. Jack as Buck Donohue (as T.C. Jacks)
 Charles Brinley as Army Scout Johnson
 Charles Hill Mailes as General Hawthorne (as Charles Hills Mailes)
 Edwin Stanley as Attorney
 Art Mix as First Lieutenant
 Frank Ellis as Randall-Rider Lafe
 Nick Cogley as Tom (uncredited)
 John Lowell as Juror (uncredited)

References

External links

1933 films
1933 Western (genre) films
American Western (genre) films
American black-and-white films
Films directed by George B. Seitz
Columbia Pictures films
1930s American films
1930s English-language films